Chance is an American television series created by Kem Nunn and Alexandra Cunningham which stars Hugh Laurie. The series is based on Nunn's 2014 book of the same name and was ordered straight-to-series in January 2016 with a straight two-season order containing twenty episodes. It premiered on Hulu on October 19, 2016. The second season premiered on October 11, 2017. On January 9, 2018, the series was cancelled.

Premise
The series focuses on a forensic neuropsychiatrist, Dr. Eldon Chance, living in San Francisco, who is semi-willingly pulled into his patient Jaclyn Blackstone's dangerous life of police corruption, manipulation, and abuse. While dealing with a divorce of his own and secrets he has been trying to hold back for years, he has to save Jaclyn, as well as himself, from her abusive partner, a corrupt detective. Chance enlists the aid of an intelligent but violent furniture restorer, Darius, who moonlights as a quasi-mercenary, and they receive low-key assistance in their vigilante endeavor from a morally ambiguous cop, Detective Hynes.

In the second season, Hynes blackmails Chance and Darius into going after a software tycoon who may secretly be a serial killer, while the pair also use Darius's fighting skills to bring justice to the various abusers of Chance's patients. The once mild-mannered Chance finds himself drawn more deeply into Darius's view of violence as a solution to problems, while also dealing with his daughter's continuing struggle with mental health problems she may have inherited from him.

Cast

Main
 Hugh Laurie as Dr. Eldon Chance
 Ethan Suplee as Darius 'D' Pringle
 LisaGay Hamilton as Suzanne Simms (season 1)
 Greta Lee as Lucy Baek
 Stefania LaVie Owen as Nicole Chance, Chance's teenage daughter.
 Paul Adelstein as Raymond Blackstone (season 1)
 Gretchen Mol as Jaclyn Blackstone, a woman being physically and mentally abused by her husband, Raymond. As a result of her abuse, she has developed a secondary personality, known as 'Jackie Black'. (season 1)
 Clarke Peters as Carl Allan (recurring, season 1; main, season 2)
 Brian Goodman as Detective Kevin Hynes (recurring, season 1; main, season 2)
 Paul Schneider as Ryan Winter (season 2)

Recurring
 Diane Farr as Christina Chance, Chance's ex-wife
 Michael McGrady as Sanford Pringle
 Elizabeth Rodriguez as Kristen Clayton (season 2)
 Alyson Reed as Lindsay (season 2)
 Ginger Gonzaga as Lorena (season 2)
 Tim Griffin as ADA Frank Lambert (season 2)

Episodes

Series overview

Season 1 (2016)

Season 2 (2017)

Release
Both seasons of Chance were later released on Disney+ via the  Star hub in selected territories following Disney's acquisition of 20th Century Fox which included the show's distributor and production company Fox 21 Television Studios.

Reception

Critical Response
On Rotten Tomatoes, the series has an approval rating of 75% based on 32 reviews. The website's critics consensus reads, "Chance is an entertaining and profoundly dark thriller primarily kept afloat by Hugh Laurie's outstanding performance."

References

External links
 
 

2016 American television series debuts
2017 American television series endings
2010s American crime drama television series
2010s American medical television series
2010s American mystery television series
English-language television shows
Hulu original programming
Television shows based on American novels
Television series by 20th Century Fox Television
Television shows set in San Francisco